John Stuart Kiely (born August 3, 1952) is an American former professional ice hockey goaltender.

Career 
Kiely played 22 games in the  World Hockey Association with the Cincinnati Stingers during the 1975–76 season. He continued his career in the AHL with the Springfield Indians and Binghamton Dusters, and in the CHL with the Oklahoma City Blazers.

As a goaltender with the Vermont Catamounts men's ice hockey team, Kiely was a part of both ECAC Division II National Championships in 1972-73, and 1973–74. Kiely ranks fifth all-time in save percentage at Vermont (.903) and fourth in goals against average (2.84).

References

External links

1952 births
Living people
American men's ice hockey goaltenders
Binghamton Dusters players
Cincinnati Stingers players
Hampton Gulls (SHL) players
Oklahoma City Blazers (1965–1977) players
San Francisco Shamrocks players
Springfield Indians players
Syracuse Blazers players
Sportspeople from Ithaca, New York
Vermont Catamounts men's ice hockey players